Kathryn Toyama is a classically trained pianist/keyboardist who composes new-age solo instrumental music.  Her album, Hope for Harmony, debuted at No.5 on the NAR World Radio Chart in May 2007.  A number of her compositions are placed in regular rotation by numerous Internet radio stations and two of them have been played on XM Satellite Radio.

Discography
Hope for Harmony

References

CD Review by  Solo Piano Publications
CD Review by New Age Reporter
Interview on The Spiritual Significance of Music: XtremeMusic
Feature at NeuFutur Magazine
CD Review by Amazings.com
CD Review by Wildys World
Feature at TheFabulousWoman.com

External links
Official website
MySpace

Living people
New-age pianists
21st-century pianists
Year of birth missing (living people)